The "No to police state" campaign is a Ukrainian civil campaign against police brutality caused by the death of 20-year-old student Igor Indylo in the police precinct of Shevchenkivskyi District, Kyiv. The campaign has demanded a proper investigation into Indylo's death and the punishment of the people guilty in his death and other high-profile cases.

Background 

Igor Indylo died in the police precinct of Shevchenkivskyi District, Kyiv on May 18, 2010. Civil activists and journalists considered his death a murder committed by constables Sergiy Pryhodko and Sergiy Kovalenko. His death captured public attention and started a civil campaign. An investigation and court process have been ongoing since January 2015. The courts have not determined the cause of death.

Timeline of Indylo's death

May 17 
 18:00 - Igor Indylo with his friend Volodymyr Lesenko started celebrating Indylo's birthday in a dormitory of Kyiv Professional Pedagogical College. According to Lesenko's statement, they drank a liter of moonshine.
 18:20 - Indylo's claimed to have seen him lying on the floor of the corridor.
 20:00 - Near the dormitory, Indylo argued with security guard Dmytro Hvorostyna and constable Sergiy Pryhodko.
 20:15 - Indylo (with no assistance) and Lesenko voluntarily sat in the constables' car and went to the police precinct of Shevchenkivskyi District.
 20:20 - The commander of the dormitory Zinaida Fedoryna called to Pryhodko and asked to release Igor. Pryhodko refused.
 20:38 - Indylo, Lesenko and Pryhodko arrived at the police precinct. According to forensics, Indylo had approximately 3 ppm of alcohol. Surveillance camera records do not appear to show Indylo walking drunkenly.
 21:00 - Indylo fell for the first time in the precinct. The cause of the fall is unknown. Policemen claim that he became unconscious, and an ambulance was called.
 21:49 - Surveillance cameras recorded Pryhodko dragging Indylo to the room for administrative detainees.
 22:11 - Indylo started moving after laying motionless on the floor for 20 minutes. If he was drunk, as policemen claimed, he would sleep soundly; if injuries were putting pressure on the brain, such behavior would be possible.

May 18 
 00:30 - The constable returned to the dormitory. He said Indylo was sleeping.
 01:23 - Indylo fell from the bench. This caused a closed head injury with fractures of the skull base.
 03:00 - Indylo did not move. According to forensics, he died approximately at this time.
 04:51 - Indylo was noticed by policeman Oleksiy Zhizherin. He turned Indylo on the back with his foot. He realized that Indylo was injured and called an ambulance.
 05:14 - Paramedics stated that Indylo was dead. They said that the cause of death was choking on his vomit.
 05:30 - Policemen woke students in the dormitory and took them to the precinct to take statements from them.
 06:00 - Police management held an emergency meeting.

Versions

Police 
Police made no statements in the first days after Indylo's death, but media attention forced police to make a statement on May 26. The Shevchenkivskyi chief of police Petro Miroshnychenko announced: "We know that Indylo fell three times. First, he was seen laying on the floor in the dormitory. Second, he fell in the presence of his friend. Third, he has fallen from the bench in the police precinct from a height of approximately half a meter."

Ukraine Parliamentary Commissioner for Human Rights 
On June 2, Ukraine Parliamentary Commissioner for Human Rights Nina Karpachova stated that Indylo's death was a murder and police will try to "hush up" the case.

Society and media 
Activists of the "No to police state" campaign pointed out controversial facts of Indylo's death and accused policemen of the police of murder.

On June 18 during a press conference in Kyiv, journalists announced the results of their own investigation. Journalist Dmytro Gnap announced that Indylo was most likely pushed hard, he hit the wall and became unconscious because the right half of his brain was injured. A brain hemorrhage started and lasted for nearly 7 hours. Then Indylo was dragged to the room for administrative detainees and left to die. Gnap also announced that Indylo was not tortured and other journalists, who took part in investigation, agreed with him.

MP Yurii Karmazin announced that he did not believe Indylo's injuries to be accidental. According to his experience in law enforcement, such injuries cannot be caused by the fall to the floor. Journalist Olena Bilozerska and human rights activist Tetyana Yablonska also believed that Indylo was tortured.

Goals 
According to activists, their goal is to punish all involved in high-profile cases of police brutality. Among these cases are:
 The death of Igor Indylo in the police precinct of Shevchenkivskyi District in Kyiv, which started the campaign;
 The beating of an activist protecting the Park of Maxim Gorky in Kharkiv from destruction. Police beat the activist by themselves or did nothing to stop other men beating activists;
 The death of Dmytro Yashuk in the police precinct of Sviatoshynskyi District in Kyiv. He was found hanged. Police claimed that he hanged himself, but others were convinced that somebody hanged him;
 The beatings of Denis Malenko, Andriy Bondar and the underage Sergiy Ivanchenko in the police precinct of Leninskiy District in Kropyvnytskyi;
 The beatings of two journalists, Dmytro Stoykov and Yevgen Safonov, by policemen in Zaporizhzhia. The guilty policeman were only reprimanded;
 The systematic obstruction of meetings and protest actions by police.

By June 2010, the demands of activists became more global. They started demanding police reform and amendments to laws. Activists demanded:
 The strengthening of punishment for misconduct, especially for tortures;
 The expansion of the powers of the Ukraine Parliamentary Commissioner for Human Rights, especially concerning the prevention and combating of torture by policemen;
 The reestablishment of public councils in all territorial divisions of the Ministry of Internal Affairs and establishment of transparent mechanisms for public access to monitor police work.

Timeline of campaign 

2010
 May 26 - Activists held an action against the beating of an activist protecting the Park of Maxim Gorky in Kharkiv from police destruction. The same day the story of Indylo's death was shown on the news on TV channel 1+1. The story told that students claimed that police put pressure on them to force them testify and that Indylo participated in a fight before police came and sat in the police car already beaten and with his head injured. It also said that in the night between May 17 and 18, ambulances came to the precinct four times and emphasized that police made no statements about the death of Indylo.
 June 1 - The first all-Ukrainian protest action against police brutality titled "We don't want to fall - we don't want to die" took place. Protesters demanded to replace all management of police precinct of Shevchenkivskyi District, to appoint a parliamentary commission to investigate all recent high-profile cases of police brutality and to publish results of the investigation of the death of Indylo. Protesters promised to repeat protest action in case their demands will not be obeyed. The action took place in 18 Ukrainian cities: in Kyiv near the police precinct of Shevchenkivskyi District, in Kharkiv, Donetsk, Lviv, Lugansk, Zhytomyr, Khmelnytskyi, Rivne, Kirovograd, Ivano-Frankivsk, Ternopil, Uzhgorod, Yevpatoria and other near regional offices of Ministry of Internal Affairs.
 June 4 - Activists held an action titled "Police is illegal" in Kyiv and Lviv which was caused by another beating of an activist protecting the Park of Maxim Gorky in Kharkiv. In Kyiv it took place near the building of Ministry of Internal Affairs. There was also a flashmob to support Kharkiv activists on Maidan Nezalezhnosti in Kyiv.
 June 10 - The second all-Ukrainian protest action against police brutality took place in 12 cities: Kyiv, Donetsk, Zaporizhia, Simferopol, Kherson, Poltava, Zhytomyr, Khmelnytskyi, Rivne, Ternopil, and others.
 June 14 - A roundtable titled "Police and society: opposition or understanding" was held in Lviv with activists and Lviv Oblast police management participating.
 June 18 - The press conference "New murders in Kyiv precincts: versions of police and parents of victims" took place in Kyiv. Police representative Volodymyr Polishuk, journalists and others announced their versions of recent high-profile deaths in police precincts of Kyiv: the death of Igor Indylo in the police precinct of Shevchenkivskyi District and the death of Dmytro Yashuk in the police precinct of Sviatoshynskyi District. A police representative denied police being involved in men's deaths. Journalists, MP Yuriy Karmazin and relatives of Dmytro Yashuk announced results of their own investigations that rejected the police version.
 June 24 - Activists organized a procession from the Square of Contracts to Mykhailivska Square. Activists performed a theatrical performance titled "The kitchen of death." Apart from demands to punish those guilty in Indylo's death and those of high-profile cases of police brutality, the new more global demands appeared: to strengthen punishment for misconduct, especially for tortures by policemen; to expand the powers of Ukraine Parliamentary Commissioner for Human Rights; to reestablish public councils in all territorial divisions of Ministry of Internal Affairs; and to establish transparent mechanisms for public access to monitor the work of police and others.
 June 26 - The residents of Lubny participated in protest actions against police brutality titled "Let's protect Lubny residents from Lubny police." organized by the mayor Vasil Koryak. It was caused by the recent beating of a boy by police and systematic misconduct and brutality of local police.
 June 28 - A flashmob against police brutality took place in Sofiivska Square in Kyiv. People laid on the pavement and their body contours were marked with a chalk.
 July 14 - Another protest action took place near the building of the Ministry of Internal Affairs in Kyiv. It started because the police officers who killed Indylo were not punished. The police officers who beat journalists in Zaporizhzhia were given soft punishment, and activists protecting the Park of Maxim Gorky in Kharkiv were arrested.
 July 22 - A protest action against police permissiveness titled "Enough telling lies!" took place near police precinct of Sviatoshynskyi District in Kyiv. Relatives and friends of Dmytro Yashuk took part. Protesters demanded to do a proper autopsy of Dmytro Yashuk's body and to tell them the names of suspects of this case.
 September 8 and 9 - People involved in solidarity actions for the Kharkiv activist were arrested for distribution of leaflets in Kyiv and Lviv.
 September 30 - A press conference about police brutality took place in Kyiv. Police was represented by Volodymyr Polishuk; victims were represented by relatives of Dmytro Yashuk, Kharkiv Human Rights Protection Group and members of the public initiative of Sviatoshynskyi District residents.

From 2011

Links 
 No to police state on vk.com

References 

Protests in Ukraine
Police brutality in Ukraine
Vidsich